St. Mary's High School is a private, Roman Catholic high school in Storm Lake, Iowa.  It is located in the Roman Catholic Diocese of Sioux City.

Background
Located three blocks from the waterfront of Storm Lake, the school offers a quality, faith-based education. The school opened in 1912 as an elementary school, and it was expanded to house Pre-K through 12th Grade in August 1967.

Athletics 
The Panthers compete in the Twin Lakes Conference in the following sports:

Cross Country 
Volleyball 
Basketball
Boys' 2011 Class 1A State Champions
Boys' 2012 Class 1A State Consolation Champions
Boys' 2013 Class 1A State Runners-Up
Track and Field
Golf 
Baseball 
 1993 Class 1A State Champions 
1997 Class 1A State Semi Finalists
2002 Class 1A State Semi Finalists 
Softball
The Panthers also combine their sports and compete with Storm Lake Public High School for Wrestling, Cross-Country, and Football at the high school level. Storm Lake High School competes in the 3A division of Iowa Athletics.

See also
List of high schools in Iowa

References

External links
 School Website

Catholic secondary schools in Iowa
Private high schools in Iowa
Schools in Buena Vista County, Iowa
Educational institutions established in 1900
1900 establishments in Iowa